Mastilo is a Bulgarian rock and pop music band. The members of the group are Victoria Terziyska, Desislav Danchev, Ivan Dimov and Nikolai Simeonov.

Biography 
Mastilo was formed in Sofia in 1999. The most popular member of the group is Victoria Terziyska, known as Viki, who was known as a leading face of TV music show Forte before she started working with of the group. Mastilo released their first album in 2002 and became very successful in Bulgaria. Since then two more albums have been released - the last one in 2006.

Discography 
Mastilo has released 4 albums - "Iгуана", "Репетиция", "Ела до мен" and "В ръцете ти е най-добре". The first one is the most successful. Some of the group's songs are:
 V dvoretsa sam sama (В двореца съм сама - I am alone in the palace)
 Moite kafevi ochi (Моите кафеви очи - My brown eyes)
 Ne se samnyavai v men (Не се съмнявай в мен - Don't doubt in me)
 Idvam (Идвам - I'm coming)

See also 
 Bulgarian music

References 

Bulgarian rock music groups